Bharat Raj Upreti (July 8, 1950 – May 24, 2015) was a justice of the Supreme Court of Nepal and a senior advocate.

Career
Bharat Raj Upreti completed his Bachelor in Commerce (B.Com.) and Diploma in Law from Tribhuwan University. In 1980, Upreti obtained degree of Master of Law (LL.M) from University of Pune, India. He enrolled as an Advocate by Supreme Court of Nepal in 1977 (2033 B.S).

Upreti also taught different subjects of commercial and constitutional Law at Tribhuwan University, Faculty of Law for 21 years. He voluntary retired in February 1995 as associate professor.

Upreti also served as visiting faculty at Kathmandu University.

The Supreme Court of Nepal awarded the title of senior advocate in 2008 ( 2065 B.S). He was appointed as Ad-Hoc Justice of Supreme Court on 22 January 2009 (9th, Magh 2065 B.S).

Death
Upreti committed suicide at his residence in Gyaneshwor, Kathmandu on May 24, 2015.

References

1950 births
2015 suicides
Justices of the Supreme Court of Nepal
20th-century Nepalese lawyers
Suicides by hanging in Nepal
21st-century Nepalese judges
Tribhuvan University alumni
People from Sindhupalchowk District